Ali Akbar Nateq-Nouri (sometimes spelt Nategh-Nouri, born 6 October 1944) is an Iranian politician, who served as the Chairman of the Parliament of Iran from 1992 to 2000. He was also the Minister of the Interior of Iran from 1981 to 1985.

Early life 
Nategh-Nouri was the son of Abulqasem Nategh-Nouri. He came to Tehran at the age of 10 with met Ruhollah Khomeini in 1961 and joined the ranks of the opponents of the government of that time. He went to prison several times and was banned from the pulpit. Nouri has a seminary education up to the level of jurisprudence and principles. He also received a bachelor's degree in theology from Tehran University. Among his professors, we can mention Ruhollah Khomeini, Morteza Motahari, Ahmad Mojtahedi Tehrani and Mohammad Taghi Falsafi.

Career
Nateq-Nouri was the interior minister of the Islamic Republic. He served as the Chairman of the Parliament from 1992 to 2000. He was a candidate in the Iranian presidential election in 1997. He was Khamanei's preferred candidate, but he lost the election to Mohammad Khatami. He was given nearly seven million votes, whereas Khatami twenty million votes. He served as an advisor to Iran's supreme leader until his resignation in 2017. He is a supporter of President Hassan Rouhani and was a critic of former Mahmoud Ahmadinejad. He officially visited Egypt in 2010. He was the first person to travel to Europe at the level of the heads of the three branches of the Islamic Republic of Iran.

Controversy
Nateq-Nouri was at the center of an international dispute in 2009 after he referred to Bahrain as Iran's 14th province. Bahrain paused negotiations with Iran regarding gas imports in response, and the Cooperation Council for the Arab States of the Gulf condemned the remarks. The Iranian foreign minister immediately commented on the controversy and stated that Nateq-Nouri's remarks about the history of Bahrain had been misinterpreted by the media and that Iran respected Bahrain's sovereignty. Nateq-Nouri himself told Al Jazeera that his remarks about the history of the region had been misunderstood and that his comment was not relevant to today's Iran-Bahrain relationship.

References

External links

|majority7=1,201,933 (56.3%)

1944 births
Living people
Iranian Shia clerics
Interior Ministers of Iran
Speakers of the Islamic Consultative Assembly
People from Mazandaran Province
Members of the Expediency Discernment Council
Candidates in the 1997 Iranian presidential election
Members of the 5th Islamic Consultative Assembly
Members of the 4th Islamic Consultative Assembly
Combatant Clergy Association politicians
Central Council of the Islamic Republican Party members
Islamic Coalition Party politicians
Impeached Iranian officials
People from Nur, Iran
20th-century Iranian politicians